Bastarm or Bestrom or Besterom may refer to:
 Bastarm-e Cheshmeh Anjir
 Bastarm-e Olya
 Bastarm-e Otaqi